The northern royal flycatcher (Onychorhynchus mexicanus) is a passerine bird in the family Tityridae according to the International Ornithological Committee (IOC). It is found in Mexico, south through most of Central America, to northwestern Colombia and far western Venezuela.

Taxonomy and systematics

The IOC considers the northern royal flycatcher and three other royal flycatcher taxa to be separate species and places them in the family Tityridae. The South American Classification Committee of the American Ornithological Society (SACC-AOS) and the Clements taxonomy consider the four to be subspecies of the widespread royal flycatcher (Onychorhynchus coronatus sensu lato). SACC-AOS places O. coronatus in family Onychorhynchidae and includes four other flycatcher species in that family. Clements places it in family Oxyruncidae and includes those four, one other flycatcher, and the sharpbill. IOC considers all of them to be in Tityridae.

The northern royal flycatcher has two subspecies, the nominate Onychorhynchus mexicanus mexicanus and O. m. fraterculus.

Description

It is brown above with small buffy spots on its wing-coverts and buffy yellow below. The rump and tail are buffy cinnamon. The bill is long and broad. It has an erectile fan-shaped crest that is orange-red in the male and yellow-orange in the female.

Distribution and habitat

The northern royal flycatcher occurs from southern Mexico into South America. However, it appears to have been extirpated from El Salvador. The nominate subspecies is found from Mexico to Panama and O. m. fraterculus in northern Colombia and northwestern Venezuela.

The northern royal flycatcher inhabits humid lowlands, both primary evergreen and second growth forests. It is a bird of the midstory, often along streams and in seasonally flooded várzea forest.

Behavior

Feeding

All of the royal flycatchers are insectivorous.

Breeding

The northern royal flycatcher breeds between April and July in Guatemala and between March and May or June in Costa Rica. The nest is long and narrow and is suspended from a branch or vine, usually above water. The clutch is two eggs; only the female incubates them and broods and feeds the nestlings.

Vocalization

The northern royal flycatcher is usually inconspicuous and quiet. Its song is  "a descending, slowing series of plaintive whistles" and its call a repeated "keeeyup or keee-yew". In this example  the song is faintly heard among the calls.

Sleep

The northern royal flycatcher sleeps at night.

Status

The IUCN has assessed the northern royal flycatcher as being of Least Concern.

References

Further reading

northern royal flycatcher
Birds of Central America
Birds of Mexico
Birds of the Yucatán Peninsula
Birds of Belize
Birds of Guatemala
Birds of Honduras
Birds of Nicaragua
Birds of Costa Rica
Birds of Panama
Birds of Colombia
Birds of Venezuela
northern royal flycatcher
northern royal flycatcher
Taxonomy articles created by Polbot